Cheers Beacon Hill is a bar/restaurant located on Beacon Street in the Beacon Hill neighborhood of Boston, Massachusetts, across from the Boston Public Garden. Founded in 1969 as the Bull & Finch Pub, the bar is best remembered internationally as the exterior of the bar seen in the hit NBC sitcom Cheers, which ran between 1982 and 1993.

History
The show used the Bull & Finch as the inspiration for the hit TV show and exterior for the series, establishing shots of the namesake bar Cheers. A slightly modernized replica of the set bar has been built on the ground floor.

The Official Preppy Handbook published in 1980 described Quaffer's (the upstairs in the Hampshire House at the time) as "Clubby, library atmosphere, with the requisite backgammon tables. Private club, but flexible, especially for ladies." The trademark, filed in 1982 has since been canceled.

In 1982 Boston magazine awarded the Bull & Finch the title of Boston's best bar.

On May 20, 1993, the night of Cheers series finale, Tom Kershaw held a large party outside of the bar to commemorate the event. Many people gathered outside the bar, and watched the finale on two large TV screens specially set up for the event. The cast of Cheers watched the finale inside the bar. On the episode of The Tonight Show with Jay Leno that aired after the finale took place live at the party outside the bar, with many celebrities including sportscaster Bob Costas in the bar, Jay Leno walked into the bar and interviewed them. Later, Leno played many games with the Cheers cast inside the bar, and at the end of the show, the Cheers theme was played outside the bar.

Between August 2001 and August 2020, there was a branch location, Cheers Faneuil Hall, in Faneuil Hall. To capitalize on the popularity of the TV show, this location was built with a replica of the TV bar. The final day of the replica bar included a live band playing the Cheers theme, an appearance by owner Tom Kershaw and a raffle to win a photocopy of the script for the final episode. 

Cheers Beacon Hill is owned by Thomas A. Kershaw, who also owns the Hampshire House restaurant upstairs and the nearby restaurants, 75 Chestnut, and 75 Liberty Wharf in the Seaport.

On March 10, 2009, the Boston Globe reported that longtime Cheers bartender Eddie Doyle, with a 35-year tenure that predated the sitcom Cheers, had been laid off. Owner Tom Kershaw cited the recession as the reason for the decision. The block on which Cheers resides has been renamed Eddie Doyle Square in his honor.

References

External links
 

1969 establishments in Massachusetts
Beacon Hill, Boston
Cheers
Cultural history of Boston
Drinking establishments in Boston
Restaurants established in 1969
Restaurants in Boston